JCS may refer to:

Arts, entertainment, and media
 JCS (band), a Filipino band
 Jesus Christ Superstar, a 1970 rock opera
 Journal of Cell Science
 Journal of Consciousness Studies
 Journal of Croatian Studies
 Journal of Cuneiform Studies
 JCS - Criminal Psychology (also known as Jim Can't Swim), a YouTube channel about criminal interrogations

Schools
 Joane Cardinal-Schubert High School
 Judah Christian School, in Champaign, Illinois, United States
 Julian Charter School, in Julian, California, United States

Other uses
 Billbergia JCS, a hybrid cultivar
 Jamaican Country Sign Language
 Jazz Creation Station, the level editor for Jazz Jackrabbit 2
 Jimmie's Chicken Shack
 Joint Chiefs of Staff (Republic of Korea)
 Joint Chiefs of Staff of the United States Department of Defense
 Judicial Correction Services, a private American probation company